Robert Greenlees (1820–1894) was a Scottish artist and educationalist. He was employed at the Glasgow School of Art as a pupil teacher, both teaching and studying. Greenlees taught drawing in the elementary classes, and became the Second Master. In 1863 the headmaster of the school, Charles Heath Wilson, retired and Greenlees was appointed his successor. He was the headmaster until 1881.

Initially Greenlees worked in stained glass. He later moved to landscape painting in oils and watercolours.

Greenlees advocated for the attendance of women pupils at life classes, and appointed four female teachers at the school. His daughter Georgina was one of the teachers. Greenlees also introduced the teaching of nautical draughtsmanship – a number of designers at the Clyde shipyards were graduates of the school. One of his pupils was the landscape artist Alexander Brownlie Docharty while another was the noted landscape artist Archibald Kay.

References

1820 births
1894 deaths
19th-century Scottish painters
Scottish male painters
Alumni of the Glasgow School of Art
19th-century Scottish male artists